Ghifari Vaiz Adhitya (born on 6 May 1999), is an Indonesian professional footballer who plays as forward for Liga 3 club NZR Sumbersari.

Honours

Individual 
Persela U19
 Liga 1 U19 Top goalscorer: 2017

References

External links
 Ghifari Adhitya Soccerway
 Ghifari Adhitya Liga Indonesia

1999 births
Living people
Indonesian footballers
Association football defenders
Persela Lamongan players
People from Banyuwangi Regency
Sportspeople from East Java
21st-century Indonesian people